One Last Fling is a 1949 American comedy film directed by Peter Godfrey and written by Richard Flournoy and William Sackheim. The film stars Alexis Smith, Zachary Scott, Douglas Kennedy, Ann Doran, Ransom M. Sherman and Veda Ann Borg. The film was released by Warner Bros. on June 30, 1949.

Plot
Olivia Pearce ran her husband Larry's music store in New York while he was off to war. Now he's home and needs someone to head his sales department, but decides to hire his uncle's secretary, Gaye Winston, instead of his wife.

A misunderstanding occurs wherein Olivia believes the job is hers. Larry, painted in a corner, gives it to her. He goes to lunch with Gaye to explain. Olivia, at another table in the restaurant, spots her husband with a woman. She claims not to be jealous, telling her lunch companion Vera that the only woman Larry ever sounded interested in was one he knew a long time ago, a Gaye Winston.

Vic Lardner bursts into the restaurant, accusing Larry of stealing his wife. It turns out Gaye and Vic are married. Olivia, seeing this scene from across the room, packs Larry's bags at home and demands a divorce. When he explains about wanting Gaye to have the job, Olivia is even more offended. Out he goes.

Some time later, Larry and Vic bump into each other in a bar. They settle their differences after Vic says he and Gaye have reconciled. Larry decides to do likewise with Olivia, but months go by as they keep missing each other. It still all turns out happily in the end.

Cast 
 Alexis Smith as Olivia Pearce
 Zachary Scott as Larry Pearce
 Douglas Kennedy as Vic Lardner
 Ann Doran as Vera Thompson
 Ransom M. Sherman as Judge Fred Bolton 
 Veda Ann Borg as Gaye Winston Lardner
 Jim Backus as Howard Pritchard
 Helen Westcott as Annie Mae Hunter
 Barbara Bates as June Payton
 Jody Gilbert as Amy Dearing

Reception
According to Warner Bros the film earned $362,000 domestically and $50,000 foreign.

References

External links 
 
 
 
 

1949 films
1949 romantic comedy films
American black-and-white films
American romantic comedy films
Comedy of remarriage films
Films directed by Peter Godfrey
Films scored by David Buttolph
Warner Bros. films
1940s English-language films
1940s American films